General elections were held in Suriname in March 1963. The result was a victory for the National Party of Suriname, which won 14 of the 36 seats.

Results

Elected members

References

Suriname
Elections in Suriname
General
Suriname
Election and referendum articles with incomplete results